Century Theatre may refer to:

Century Theatre (Buffalo, New York), U.S.
Century Theatre (Detroit), U.S.
Century Theatre (Central Park West), a demolished theater on the Upper West Side, Manhattan, New York, U.S.
Century Theatre (Toronto), Canada, now Danforth Music Hall
Century Theatre (mobile theatre), now at Snibston, Leicestershire, England
Century Theatres, an American movie theatre chain
Century Theatre, now Sony Hall, a former Broadway theater in the Theater District, Manhattan, New York, U.S.
Century Theatre, now Village East by Angelika, a former off-Broadway theater in the East Village, Manhattan, New York, U.S.

See also

New Century Theatre, a former Broadway theatre in Manhattan, New York City, U.S.
The Schaefer Century Theatre, an American television anthology series